Cole Alexander/Bradford Cox Split is a 2006 EP by Bradford Cox as Atlas Sound and Cole Alexander released on Rob's House Records. Five-hundred black 10" vinyls were pressed and another 500 were repressed. This was the first release for Bradford Cox under the Atlas Sound name. Cole Alexander is the lead singer of The Black Lips and Bradford Cox is the lead singer of Deerhunter.

Track listing
Bradford Cox as Atlas Sound
"Alt, Alt, Alt"
"Magic Lotion"
"Onset"
"Shock Mountain"

Cole Alexander
"In My Mind"
"Fry"
"Garden of Eden"
"I Drank It Down"
"Full Moon (Ode to Half Moon Rising)"

Credits
Bradford Cox - music and lyrics
Cole Alexander - music and lyrics

References

2006 EPs
Split EPs